The Chink in the Armour is a 1912 novel by the British writer Marie Belloc Lowndes.

Film adaptation
In 1922 it was made into a British silent film The House of Peril directed by Kenelm Foss and starring Fay Compton.

References

Bibliography
 Goble, Alan. The Complete Index to Literary Sources in Film. Walter de Gruyter, 1999.

External links
 

1912 British novels
Novels by Marie Belloc Lowndes
British novels adapted into films